American country music artist Chely Wright has released eight studio albums, three compilation albums, one video album, four extended plays, 24 singles, 18 music videos, and appeared on six albums. Wright first issued two unsuccessful studio albums under Polydor Records: Woman in the Moon (1994) and Right in the Middle of It (1996). Both albums were critically acclaimed despite their lack of success. Her third studio album Let Me In (1997) reached number 25 on the Billboard Top Country Albums chart and spawned the hit single "Shut Up and Drive". It was Wright's fourth studio album that brought forth her biggest success, Single White Female. Released in May 1999, it reached number 15 on the country albums chart, number 124 on the Billboard 200, and certified gold from the Recording Industry Association of America. The title track reached the top of the Billboard Hot Country Songs chart in 1999 and was followed by the top 20 hit "It Was".

Wright's fifth studio record Never Love You Enough (2001) reached the top 10 of the Billboard Top Country Albums chart. Both the title track and "Jezebel" were top 30 hit singles on the country songs chart. After releasing an extended play, Wright launched her sixth studio album in February 2005, The Metropolitan Hotel. She took a five-year hiatus between the latter and her seventh studio album Lifted Off the Ground (2010). Spending 13 weeks on the country albums chart, it peaked at number 32 and also charted within the Billboard 200. In 2016, her eighth studio album was released titled I Am the Rain. The project peaked at number 13 on the country albums chart. Chely Wright has sold over one million records according to Nielsen Soundscan.

Albums

Studio albums

Compilation albums

Extended plays

Singles

As lead artist

As a featured artist

Other charted songs

Videography

Video albums

Music videos

Other appearances

Notes

References

External links 
 Official Website
 Chely Wright discography at Discogs

Country music discographies
Discographies of American artists